Xavier Williams (born January 18, 1992) is an American football nose tackle who is a free agent. He played college football at the University of Northern Iowa. He was signed as an undrafted free agent by the Cardinals.

Early years
Williams attended Grandview High School, where he was named a first-team all conference selection. He was named to the Suburban Mid-Six team in 2009 and earned first-team all metro honors. Aside from football, Williams was a three-year starter and two-time qualifier in wrestling.

College career
Williams attended the University of Northern Iowa between 2010–2014. He was earned All-Missouri Valley Football Conference First-team Honors in both 2013 and 2014. Williams had the opportunity to play in the East-West Shrine Game following his senior season, where he performed well at the defensive tackle position

Professional career

Arizona Cardinals
On May 5, 2015, Williams signed with the Arizona Cardinals as an undrafted free agent. In his rookie year in 2015, he played 4 games making 2 tackles.

On March 13, 2018, the Cardinals placed an original round restricted free agent tender on Williams, which allows a player to negotiate a contract with another team, but their original team can match the offer, if they refuse, they receive a draft pick from the round the player was drafted in. For undrafted players, like Williams, the team receives no compensation.

Kansas City Chiefs
On March 20, 2018, Williams received a contract offer from the Kansas City Chiefs giving the Cardinals a chance to match. The Cardinals declined to match the Chiefs offer, so he signed his offer sheet with the Chiefs.

On October 9, 2019, Williams was placed on injured reserve with a high ankle sprain. He was designated for return from injured reserve on December 4, 2019, and began practicing with the team again. He was activated on December 25, 2019. Williams won Super Bowl LIV with Chiefs after defeating the San Francisco 49ers 31–20.

After becoming a free agent in March 2020, Williams visited the Tampa Bay Buccaneers on August 8, 2020, and had a tryout with the New England Patriots on August 20, 2020.

New England Patriots
On August 22, 2020, Williams signed with the New England Patriots. On September 5, 2020, he was waived by the team and added to the practice squad the following day. He was elevated to the active roster on September 12 for the team's week 1 game against the Miami Dolphins, and reverted to the practice squad after the game on September 14. He was released on October 2, 2020.

Cincinnati Bengals
On October 12, 2020, Williams was signed by the Cincinnati Bengals.
Williams made his debut with the Bengals in Week 6 against the Indianapolis Colts.  During the game, Williams recovered a fumble lost by tight end Jack Doyle and later recorded his first sack of the season on Philip Rivers during the 31–27 loss.

Arizona Cardinals (second stint)
On June 7, 2021, Williams signed with the Arizona Cardinals. He was placed on injured reserve on August 8, 2021. He was released on August 16.

Houston Texans
On December 21, 2021, Williams was signed to the Houston Texans active roster. He was released on December 31.

References

External links
University of Northern Iowa bio

1992 births
Living people
American football defensive tackles
Arizona Cardinals players
Cincinnati Bengals players
Houston Texans players
Kansas City Chiefs players
New England Patriots players
Northern Iowa Panthers football players
Players of American football from Kansas City, Missouri